The 2006 WNBA Playoffs was the postseason for the Women's National Basketball Association's 2006 season which ended with the Eastern Conference champion Detroit Shock defeating the Western Conference champion Sacramento Monarchs 3-2.

Format
The top 4 teams from each conference qualify for the playoffs.
All 4 teams are seeded by basis of their standings.
The series for rounds one and two are in a best-of-three format with Games 2 and 3 on the home court of the team with the higher seed.
The series for the WNBA Finals is in a best-of-five format with Games 1, 2 and 5 on the home court of the team with the higher seed.
Reseeding (as used in the Stanley Cup Playoffs) is not in use: therefore, all playoff matchups are predetermined via the teams' seedings.

Playoff qualifying

Eastern Conference
The following teams clinched a playoff berth in the East:
Connecticut Sun (26–8)
Detroit Shock (23–11)
Indiana Fever (21–13)
Washington Mystics (18–16)

Western Conference
The following teams clinched a playoff berth in the West:
Los Angeles Sparks (25–9)
Sacramento Monarchs (21–13)
Houston Comets (18–16)
Seattle Storm (18–16)

Bracket
This was the outlook for the 2006 WNBA Playoffs. Teams in italics had home court advantage. Teams in bold advanced to the next round.  Numbers to the left of each team indicate the team's original playoffs seeding in their respective conferences.  Numbers to the right of each team indicate the number of games the team won in that round.

Eastern Conference

First round

(1) Connecticut Sun vs. (4) Washington Mystics

(2) Detroit Shock vs. (3) Indiana Fever

Conference finals

(1) Connecticut Sun vs. (2) Detroit Shock

Western Conference

First round

(1) Los Angeles Sparks vs. (4) Seattle Storm

(2) Sacramento Monarchs vs. (3) Houston Comets

Conference finals

(1) Los Angeles Sparks vs. (2) Sacramento Monarchs

WNBA Finals: (2) Sacramento Monarchs vs. (2) Detroit Shock

References

Playoffs
Women's National Basketball Association Playoffs